The Australian Football International Cup (also known as the AFL International Cup or simply the IC) is a triennial international Australian rules football  sport competition. It is the biggest worldwide tournament in the sport and is open to all nations (except for Australia due to the presence of the professional AFL competition and an abundance of semi-professional leagues). More than 26 nations have participated and the competition has expanded into multiple pools and both men and women's divisions. The most recent event 2020 was postponed and then cancelled due to the COVID-19 pandemic and subsequently postponed until 2024. At the time of the last tournament in 2017, the sport had a record 170,744 registered players outside Australia (upwards of 23% of total registered players worldwide) growing at a rate of 25% per annum (as compared to an Australian participation growth rate of 10%).

The inaugural 2002 tournament was organised by the first world governing body, the International Australian Football Council. With the AFL Commission assuming control over the game internationally, since 2005 it has been run by the AFL's game development arm. The IC Grand Final of each men's tournament has been held at the Melbourne Cricket Ground as a curtain raiser to a home-and-away match of the AFL premiership season. Though it is run under the banner of the AFL Commission, the AFL's official Laws of the Game are not used, an Amateurs variation is instead applied, acknowledging the primarily amateur composition of the competition and that players are not paid for participating.

Although the competition has grown, its status has remained low for more than two decades and the arrangement has been criticised due to the focus on the domestic competition as well as the AFL's commitment to fund and promote the sport internationally being questioned. The international governing body has itself has cited "the significant investment required from the AFL to host the event" as a primary reason for its ongoing postponement. The Commission stated that it would "continue to review its ability" to stage the tournament in future. Competition scheduling discourages it as a standalone spectator event with few pool matches played at stadiums; matches are generally played on weekdays during business hours and rarely with access to ticketed admission, allocated seating, or covered areas. The event and matches receive very little if any promotion. Though a few blockbusters have been played as curtain raisers to AFL matches, they are generally not advertised and attract mostly neutral observers as they filter in early for the main event the record for which was 76,703 at Papua New Guinea vs New Zealand at the 2008 IC Grand Final there for the 2008 AFL Second Qualifying final. Despite the limited accessibility for spectators some regional matches played on weekends have attracted significant attendances, with the current attendance record of 5,000 at The Showgrounds, Wangaratta.

Eligibility rules are very strict compared those of other international competitions. Generally speaking players must be a citizen of the country they represent and have lived there through roughly middle school and high school ages (when most players usually learn the key skills required). IC criteria ensures that expatriate Australians, Australians with overseas ancestry and those who moved to Australia at a young age are ineligible to compete (with the exception of the short lived and unsuccessful women's Indigenous & Multicultural (OzIM) composite amateurs team in 2011). These rules, combined with professional contracts and limited pathways for players typically precludes professional players from participating. In addition there is a per team cap on players registered with Australian clubs. Despite this, since the 2011 competition, the cup has featured a number of AFL listed internationals and rookies, however these players had to first negotiate a release from their AFL/AFLW contracts before nominating and are not paid for their appearances. To date three players have played senior matches at the highest level in both competitions, the amateur IC and professional club competition: Hewago Oea (Papua New Guinea/AFL), Laura Duryea (Ireland/AFLW) and Clara Fitzpatrick (Ireland/AFLW). Likewise, the tournament forms a pathway for international players to the AFL, with numerous players having been rookie listed by AFL clubs after their performances in the competition.

History

When the International Australian Football Council was formed in 1995 one of its aims was to 'establish and promote an official World Cup of Australian Football'. At the time it was thought that 2008, being the 150th anniversary of the game, was the appropriate date.

However, in 1999 a proposal was received from the New Zealand Australian Football League (NZAFL), suggesting that the World Cup be brought forward to 2002. This was accepted by the council and, following visits to many countries, IAFC public relations officer Brian Clarke drafted a discussion paper and draft regulations for circulation to the various national bodies.

An approach was then made to the AFL, asking for their support in staging the event. The AFL agreed on the basis that the event was renamed the "International Cup". An organising committee, chaired by Ed Biggs and including AFL and IAFC representatives, was then appointed.

The inaugural competition, the 2002 Australian Football International Cup, was held between 14 August and 23 August 2002 (in conjunction with the International Australian Football Council), with 11 countries competing including Canada, Denmark, Ireland, Japan, Nauru, New Zealand, Papua New Guinea, Samoa, South Africa, the United Kingdom, and the United States. All matches were played in Melbourne at mainly second tier suburban and Victorian Football League home grounds. Ireland defeated Papua New Guinea in the final at the Melbourne Cricket Ground.

The second cup in 2005 was run by the AFL's Game Development arm, as the IAFC had been dissolved. It saw the addition of Spain but the withdrawal of Denmark and Nauru for financial reasons. While most of the venues were similar to 2002, it was the first tournament to have matches held outside Melbourne, with the Victorian city of Wangaratta hosting one of the later rounds. New Zealand won their first championship.

The third cup in 2008 saw a record sixteen nations with China, India, Sweden, Finland and a combined Israel-Palestine side (known as the Peres Peace Team) debuting. Tonga entered as a seventeenth team, but as they were unable to commit to the full draw they played a series of multicultural exhibition matches against Team Asia and Team Africa, sides drawn from Melbourne's migrant communities. Like the previous cup, the 2008 event had some matches played outside of Melbourne with the western Victorian city of Warrnambool billed as the co-host and other games being held in Geelong and at Royal Park, Melbourne, featured as a primary venue in subsequent Cups. Papua New Guinea, which had advanced to the Grand Final in both previous tournaments, won its first title.

The fourth tournament, the 2011 Australian Football International Cup, was the first to play matches outside of Victoria, with Sydney being billed as co-host. Blacktown International Sports Park and suburban grounds hosted some of the early round matches and a historic first international at ANZ Stadium between the USA and South Africa played as a curtain raiser to a Sydney Swans AFL match. A record 18 nations competed, and a women's division was competed for alongside the men's competition for the first time. It was the first tournament to feature a side from Australia, the OzIM women's team, composed of amateur indigenous and multicultural players, however the team did not perform well. It was also the first tournament to be split into divisions, seeded from an opening round lighting-style format similar to the 2011 NAB Cup. The tournament saw the addition of teams from Fiji (who went on to take out Men's Division 2), France and Timor-Leste. Tonga, who had previously withdrawn, also competed but Finland and Samoa did not send teams. Ireland won the title in both men's and women's divisions.

The 2014 Australian Football International Cup saw a significant increase in international and media interest. Once again, 18 teams competed. The Israel-Palestine combine was no longer represented and Denmark announced a return to its domestic game development policy. Indonesia and Pakistan made debuts in their place. As in previous tournaments, one of the rounds was played outside of Melbourne, with matches played at suburban grounds in Melbourne along with regional matches at Bendigo, Ballarat and Geelong. South Africa, Fiji and France were the standout improvers. Papua New Guinea regained their title in the men's, winning their second title in five tries, while Sweden finished top of division 2. Fiji and Tonga debuted in the women's division and the United States and Canada both fielded two women's teams making a record 7 teams. Canada achieved a historic first ever title in the women's, defeating Ireland at Punt Road Oval.

The 2017 Australian Football International Cup once again featured 18 men's teams, including debutante Sri Lanka, reflecting the game's growth in the Indian subcontinent. European teams were finding travel difficult, with northern European nations Finland, Denmark and Sweden (Sweden having competed in both the 2016 Europe Championships and also Denmark in the 2016 and 2017 EU Cups) pulling out, though Croatia and Germany made solid debuts. For the first time, the men's divisions were determined prior to the tournament instead of preliminary matches. Two themed rounds were featured: the School round, where matches were played at Victorian schools, and the Community round, as in 2014 where matches were played at suburban grounds in Melbourne and Geelong. Papua New Guinea won back-to-back men's titles, Croatia won a historic first Division 2 title. In the women's, Great Britain, Pakistan and the European Crusaders joined a record field of eight teams with no nations fielding more than one team. Ireland regained its women's title over Canada at Docklands Stadium in the first women's grand final match played as an AFL curtain raiser.

The 2020 International Cup was scheduled for 21 July – 8 August in Sunshine Coast, Queensland. It was initially postponed until 2021 due to the COVID-19 pandemic before being cancelled altogether in 2021. Prior to the tournament several changes had been announced. Criteria were made more strict, reducing the number of Australian based players allowed to compete. New Zealand announced the planned entry of its first women's team. The AFL had, for the first time, announced capping the men's competition to 16 teams and the women's to eight.

In August 2021, the AFL announced that the IC would return in 2023 to align with its original three-year schedule. No host as yet been announced. On 22 April 2022, the AFL announced it was postponing the International Cup until 2024 citing "significant investment required from the AFL to host the event". The AFL did not commit to a host, but alluded to the possibility that the winning Sunshine Coast bid may stand.

Men's International Cup

Division 1 Grand final and third place playoff results
Prior to 2011, all men's teams competed in one division.

Overall tournament results
Sorted by winning percentage, with draws counted as half a win, half a loss, and percentage (points for/points against x 100).

Overall tournament placings

Women's International Cup

Grand final and third place playoff results

Overall tournament results
Sorted by winning percentage, with draws counted as half a win, half a loss, and percentage (points for/points against x 100).

Overall tournament placings

Men's Division 2 results
Since the 2011 Australian Football International Cup the Men's competition has been split into two Divisions, with the format differing from each past edition.  In 2011 and 2014, the divisional lineup was decided by a preliminary competition that involved all eighteen teams.  In 2017, the divisions were pre determined prior to the tournament, with ten teams playing in Division 1 and eight playing in Division 2.

In 2014, Division Two was decided by ladder position.

Grand final and third place playoff results

Overall tournament placings

Qualification & Player Eligibility
As of the cancelled 2020 tournament there is no formal system in place for qualification of participating sides and countries are extended open invitations to send sides. The AFL had, for the first time, announced capping the men's competition to 16 teams and the women's to eight however no system for qualification has been proposed. While there are now established regional tournaments in Europe, Asia and North America performance in these tournaments does formally affect seedings for the International Cup.

The tournament is geared towards development of the sport outside Australia and as such player eligibility rules are much more strict than those of other international football competitions. Generally speaking players must be a citizen of the country they represent and have lived there through roughly middle school and high school ages (so that is usually where they learned to play). IC criteria ensures that expatriate Australians, Australians with overseas ancestry and those who moved to Australia at a young age are ineligible to compete (with the exception of the women's OzIM team, which is composed of indigenous and multicultural Australians). These rules, combined with professional contracts and limited pathways for players typically precludes professional players from participating and players wishing to participate must negotiate their own release from their AFL/AFLW contracts before nominating.  In addition there is a per team cap on players registered with Australian clubs which countries teams from stacking their teams with talent developed in Australia. This limit was initially set to 12, however with the increasing number of international players participating in Australian competitions and an increasing number of players learning the game outside Australia, this was later reduced to 8.

Current AFL/AFLW listed Players
The following AFL and AFLW listed international players have previously represented their country at the IC.

AFL/AFLW listed players who have participated while contracted
No senior AFL players on contracts have yet been released to play in the International Cup, like most amateur representative competitions, this is primarily due to the risk of injury. However clubs will sometimes make exclusions to allow the participation of lower paid rookies, international scholarship players and AFL Women's players in the amateur tournament.

Individual honours

Best And Fairest
Tournament best and fairests have been named since 2005. In addition, each nation typically nominates their best and fairest player.

World team honours
A World (formerly All-International) Team is selected from the best players (similarly to the All-Australian Team selection in the AFL). Prior to 2008, field positions and captaincy positions were not nominated. Captaincies have not been nominated since 2014.

Men's World Team
The following players have been nominated more than twice:

Broadcasting and audience
The IC has maintained a low media profile for more than two decades.

Attendance
Apart from the Grand Final which is played as a curtain raiser, matches not scheduled for stadiums are free entry and are generally played midday and mid-week prohibiting it as a spectator event, though some regional matches have been played on weekends. As such, only two regional matches have attracted a significant attendance: 5,000 attended Japan vs South Africa in 2005 at City Oval in Wangaratta and 3,500 attended Papua New Guinea vs South Africa at Reid Oval in Warrnambool

Broadcast media
The 2002 tournament was video recorded and posted on the IAFC website though there were no live broadcasts. The United States Australian Football League also provided video coverage and recorded a documentary on its participation.
In 2005 tournament attracted some coverage from Fox Sports including a Grand Final replay on Fox Sports (Australia) and the Fox Footy Channel, though matches were not broadcast. Some community radio and television stations in Victoria also provided limited coverage and World Footy News provided score updates. The AFL began posting videos of the 2008 tournament on its website along with editorial posts after the matches were played. The AFL failed to secure a broadcast partner for the 2011 tournament, instead adding delayed highlights to their online video service. For the 2014 tournament the AFL included live streaming for the first time and the tournament attracted media interest from outside Australia. For the 2017 tournament the AFL partnered with Internet service YouTube to provide live streaming of the three rounds held at Royal Park and the two Grand Finals. The USAFL, AFL Canada, World Footy News, and the Eastern Football League provided supplementary coverage of the school and community rounds.

IC coverage was not included in the AFL's record breaking 2.5 billion broadcasting deal in 2015 or contract negotiations in 2019 for the 2020 extension, though Kayo will stream AFLW matches.  There were efforts to help raise the event's profile by broadcasting the 2017 International Cup on SBS, an organisation devoted to multicultural, multi-lingual entertainment, but this did not materialize

Hosts
The inaugural IAFC tournament was held in the game's spiritual home of Melbourne, with some games at suburban stadiums around the city.

With the AFL headquartered in Melbourne, all events have been hosted in Victoria, Australia with regional matches in Warrnambool (2008), Wangaratta (2005), the exception being matches scheduled for Sydney, New South Wales in 2011. 
The West Australian Football League expressed an interest in bidding for the 2008 cup to go to Perth, Western Australia however the AFL did not open up hosting to bidders and the tournament was held in Victoria instead.

The cancelled 2020 tournament was the first time in the history of the event that the AFL opened up to bidders as part of a closed bidding process. Among newly introduced criteria was that the grounds must meet the AFL's Preferred Facility Guidelines at Regional level to qualify. These include requirements for the ground dimensions and surface, staff facilities, lighting and accessibility. The guidelines are mainly aimed at providing AFL staff with maximum amenity, there are no requirements for spectator seating, viewing mounds and a covered area under which spectators can stand are deemed sufficient for calculating ground capacity. The guidelines, combined with the requirement to have at least two main fields meeting this requirement in close proximity, has significantly raised the barrier to entry for hosting the tournament.

The result was selection between two bids, a Ballarat, Victoria bid to hold matches at the Eureka Stadium precinct and adjoining ovals North Oval No.2 (which underwent a total $38.5 million in upgrades to meet AFL standard criteria from 2016-2020) and a Sunshine Coast, Queensland bid backed by the Queensland government in partnership with Tourism and Events Queensland and Sunshine Coast Council to hold matches at the Maroochydore Multi Sports Complex (which underwent a total $5.8 million in upgrades to meet the AFL standard criteria in 2019-2020).

At the end of 2019, the AFL announced that it had selected the Sunshine Coast bid which would have seen the event hosted outside of Melbourne and Victoria for the first time (not counting the 2011 event which saw some secondary matches played in Western Sydney). As part of the Queensland bid, the Grand Finals would be played at the Brisbane Cricket Ground as a curtain raiser to a Brisbane Lions AFL premiership match. Queensland remained the successful bidder when the tournament was postponed until 2021. However following the cancellation of the 2020 tournament, no announcement was made as to whether the Queensland bid would be retained. On 22 April 2022, the AFL announced it would be continuing discussions with the winning Sunshine Coast bid.

Popular culture
The AFL (video game series) by Melbourne game developer Wicked Witch Software has featured selectable teams, including player names, from the IC. In particular, AFL Evolution and AFL Evolution 2 let players play the entire IC17 tournament, but at AFL-standard stadiums from around Australia.

Pathway to Professional AFL and Semi-Professional leagues in Australia
The IC has been a development pathway for several players who have been rookie listed or received an international scholarship with professional AFL clubs or clubs from semi-professional competitions throughout Australia. The first player to this pathway was Laura Corrigan who made an AFLW debut in 2016 following a 2011 senior appearance for Ireland. In 2022, the first male player, Hewago Oea made his debut in the AFL following a 2017 senior appearance for Papua New Guinea.

IC's potential as a pathway was first promoted by Kevin Sheedy while coaching at the Essendon Football Club, following the 2005 cup he invited Japanese IC players Michito Sakaki and Tsuyoshi Kase to train and play with the club's pre-season team. Though Essendon did not recruit Sakaki, he received an invitation to AFL Draft Camp and the exposure was a catalyst for the Wodonga Raiders club contracting him to play semi-professionally in the strong Ovens & Murray league in 2006.

For older international players, the IC is one of the only options for players other than moving to Australia and moving up the semi-professional competition pathway, to be noticed by recruiters and rookie listed to the AFL or AFLW. Unlike the AFL International Combine open-aged pathway, the IC is accessible to amateurs from a much broader international area and tests their gameplay and game sense, rather than just their athletic attributes.

For underaged international players the IC provides an alternative pathway and the opportunity to prove their ability to compete at a high senior level. Currently only New Zealand competes against the AFL Academy (Australia's best junior players) (though South Africa has in the past). The Under 16 and AFL U18/U19 Championships, AFL Women's Under 18 Championships and AFL Draft held in Australia and the Pacific Nations Youth tournament do not provide the opportunity to test players ability against fully developed players, and provide limited opportunities for youth not willing to relocate to Oceania.

Since the first IC has been a major pathway for Papua New Guineans to play professionally (even with affiliations to Queensland in the National Championships). IC players from PNG finding their way to AFL clubs have included Amua Pirika, Hewago Oea (both debuted for Papua New Guinea at just 17 years of age) and Stanis Susuve at the Gold Coast, Theo Gavuri at the GWS Giants and John James Lavai, Brendan Beno and David Meli at the Brisbane Lions.

IC players from other countries to have been recruited to play professionally include Padraig Lucey (Ireland) at Geelong Football Club, Joe Baker-Thomas (New Zealand) at St Kilda Football Club, Yoshi Harris (Nauru) at GWS Giants, and Kendra Heil (Canada) at Collingwood. All of these players were rookie listed shortly following outstanding performances in an IC tournament.

See also

Australian Football Harmony Cup
Australian rules football around the world
Countries playing Australian rules football
List of International Australian rules football tournaments
World rankings

References

External links

AFL International Cup 2014 Home Page
New Zealand's Haka versus Samoan's Siva Tau - Wangaratta - International Cup 2005 from Google Videos.
Samoan Siva Tau - International Cup 2005 from Google Videos.
Papua New Guinea War Dance - International Cup 2005 from YouTube.
South Africa and Canada post match song from Google Videos.

 
International Australian rules football tournaments
Australian
Recurring sporting events established in 2002